The shortfin sandskate (Psammobatis normani) is a species of fish in the family Arhynchobatidae. It is found off the shores of Argentina and Chile. Its natural habitat is open seas.

References

Psammobatis
Taxonomy articles created by Polbot
Fish described in 1983